Karen Hideko Sasahara (born 1959) is an American diplomat who served as Consul General in Jerusalem until the US Embassy in Israel moved to Jerusalem, and the US Consulate closed down. She is the nominee to be the next United States Ambassador to Kuwait.

Early life and education
Sasahara was born in Cambridge, Massachusetts to Dr. and Mrs. Arthur A. Sasahara and raised in the Boston area. Sasahara has a M.A. in Near East Studies from the George Washington University, and a B.A. in International Relations from the University of Wisconsin-Milwaukee.

Career
Sasahara is a member of the Senior Foreign Service, with the rank of Minister-Counselor. As Consul General, she was the point person for the State Department with the Palestinian Authority.  Her next assignment was Chargé d'Affaires, a.i. at the U.S. Embassy in Amman since March, 2019.

In 1989 she served as Political and Economic officer at the US Consulate General in Jedda, Saudi Arabia.

Ambassador Nomination to Kuwait
On August 19, 2022, President Joe Biden nominated Sasahara to be the next ambassador to Kuwait. On September 6, 2022, her nomination was sent to the Senate. Sasahara's nomination expired at the end of the year and was returned to President Biden on January 3, 2023.

President Biden renominated Sasahara the following day. Her nomination is currently pending before the Senate Foreign Relations Committee.

Personal life
Sasahara is married to fellow diplomat Michael Ratney. She speaks Arabic, Spanish, French and Russian.

References

People from Cambridge, Massachusetts
1959 births
Living people
George Washington University alumni
University of Wisconsin–Milwaukee alumni
Ambassadors of the United States to Jordan
United States Foreign Service personnel
American women ambassadors
American consuls
American women diplomats